Ken Borton is an American politician serving as a member of the Michigan House of Representatives from the 105th district. Elected in November 2020, he assumed office on January 1, 2021.

Education 
Borton earned a Bachelor of Arts degree in Bible study and biblical counseling from Liberty University.

Career 
Borton has worked as an administrator for the Michigan Association of Counties and the Northern Michigan Counties Association. He was a member of the board of directors of the National Association of Counties from 2018 to 2020. He also served as chair of the Otsego County Board of Commissioners. Borton was elected to the Michigan House of Representatives in November 2020 and assumed office on January 1, 2021.

References 

Living people
Republican Party members of the Michigan House of Representatives
Liberty University alumni
People from Otsego County, Michigan
People from Gaylord, Michigan
Year of birth missing (living people)
21st-century American politicians